Kujakowice may refer to the following neighbouring villages in Gmina Kluczbork in south-western Poland:
Kujakowice Górne ("upper Kujakowice")
Kujakowice Dolne ("lower Kujakowice")